William Bishop may refer to:

Politicians

William Bishop (politician) (1817–1879), Missouri State Treasurer 1865–1869
William D. Bishop (1827–1904), U.S. Representative from Connecticut
William S. Bishop (1804–1863), New York politician

Sports
Bill Bishop (American football) (1931–1998), NFL player
Bill Bishop (1880s pitcher) (1869–1932), baseball pitcher for the Pittsburgh Alleghenys and Chicago White Stockings
Bill Bishop (1920s pitcher) (1900–1956), pitcher for the Philadelphia Athletics

Others
Bill Bishop (author) (born 1953), American author, journalist and social commentator
Bill Bishop (businessman) (1958–2018), American real estate developer and murder victim
Billy Bishop (1894–1956), Canadian First World War pilot
Bradford Bishop (William Bradford Bishop; born 1936), United States Foreign Service officer and fugitive from justice
William Bishop (actor) (1918–1959), American actor
William Bishop (bishop) (c. 1553–1624), English priest
William Warner Bishop (1871–1955), librarian
William Henry Bishop (1847–1928), American novelist
William John Bishop (1903–1961), British librarian, editor and writer
Col. William Bishop, a video game character in Ace Combat: Assault Horizon